Anthene arora is a butterfly in the family Lycaenidae. It is found in Yemen and south-western Saudi Arabia.

References

Butterflies described in 1983
Anthene